Bow Valley was a provincial electoral district in Alberta, Canada, mandated to return a single member to the Legislative Assembly of Alberta from 1913 to 1940, and again from 1971 to 1997.

History

The Bow Valley electoral district was formed in 1913 from the Gleichen and Lethbridge District electoral districts. Bow Valley would be abolished prior to the 1940 Alberta general election, primarily forming Bow Valley-Empress electoral district, and a small portion added to Edson electoral district.

Bow Valley was revived in the 1970 electoral district re-distribution from the Bow Valley-Empress electoral district.

In the 1996 electoral district re-distribution, the Bow Valley electoral district was abolished and the territory was divided among Strathmore-Brooks, Drumheller-Chinook and Cypress-Medicine Hat electoral districts. The Electoral Boundaries Commission drafted the report with the intention of the Strathmore-Brooks electoral district retaining the name "Bow Valley".

Members of the Legislative Assembly (MLAs)
The 1926 Alberta general election would be the first held under single transferable vote in rural districts. Liberal leader Joseph Tweed Shaw came in second in the first count to United Farmers of Alberta candidate Ben S. Plumer. However, as per the rules of Instant-runoff voting, Plumer was not declared elected because he did not have a majority of the votes. After the least popular candidate was eliminated and his votes transferred, Shaw accumulated a majority and was declared elected. Shaw won the district by one vote.

Election results

1913 general election

1913 by-election

1917 general election

1921 general election

1926 general election

1930 general election

1935 general election

1971 general election

1975 general election

1979 general election

1982 general election

1986 general election

1989 general election

1993 general election

See also
List of Alberta provincial electoral districts

References

Further reading

External links
Elections Alberta
The Legislative Assembly of Alberta

Former provincial electoral districts of Alberta